Alpha Phi Omega chapters in the United States are the basic organizational divisions of the Alpha Phi Omega fraternity at accredited U.S. college and university campuses. These chapters execute the fraternity national programs to provide opportunities for the development of service projects and programs, social awareness, friendship and leadership skills.

Alpha Phi Omega also has a number of extension efforts, which are groups that are preparing to become active chapters. Such groups begin initially as an Interest Group, and then become Petitioning Groups before gaining (or regaining) their charter and becoming Active Chapters. Altogether, this extension process takes approximately one to two years.

Information is current as of September 26, 2016.

Chapter Geographical information
Alpha Phi Omega organizes the country into 17 geographical regions numbered generally West to East. These regions are designated with Letters. Each of these Regions elects a Region Chair (position formerly known as Regional Director) who represents them on the National Operations Council. Each of these Regions are further divided into between 2 and 6 sections.

Chapter Chronological information

Alpha Phi Omega chapters can be chartered at any accredited four year or two year college or university in the United States.

Petitioning Groups
1.  Petitioning Groups for rechartering efforts are referred to by the School Name, not the Greek Letters of the chapter they are attempting to recharter. Greek Letters provided for reference.

Interest Groups

2.  Interest Groups for rechartering efforts are referred to by the School Name, not the Greek Letters of the chapter they are attempting to recharter. Greek Letters provided for reference.

References

External links
 

USA chapters
Alpha Phi Omega (USA)